Anthony J. Russo (January 1, 1920 – March 6, 1985) was a member of the Ohio House of Representatives. He left office after his district was redistricted to be the home of two different Democratic incumbents, in a move aimed at removing him from office.

References

Democratic Party members of the Ohio House of Representatives
1920 births
1985 deaths
20th-century American politicians